Tierra Linda Middle School is a middle school in San Carlos, California, United States, founded in 1953. It is one of two middle schools within the San Carlos Elementary School District, and since 2018, has served students in grades 6–8. Due to changing enrollment, the school was closed in 1982, but reopened in 2000. The school is known for its diverse and award-winning music program. It shares a campus with Mariposa Upper Elementary School and San Carlos Charter Learning Center.

About 
Tierra Linda Middle School serves students in grades 6–8, and as of the 2019–2020 school year, is home to 500 students. Most students come from Mariposa Upper Elementary School, a bridge school for grades 4–5 that shares Tierra Linda's campus. After graduation from the San Carlos Elementary School District, most students are geographically slotted to attend Carlmont High School, although some students choose to attend other schools within the Sequoia Union High School District or a nearby private school.

Students enroll in a class in six main subject areas: Language Arts, Social Studies, Mathematics, Science, Physical Education, and an Elective. Electives include art, band, orchestra, and design thinking, and as students progress through their time at Tierra Linda, there are more choices available to them. On Wednesdays and Thursdays, the school operates a block schedule, under which students attend half their classes on Wednesday and the other half on Thursday, participating in each class for roughly 90 minutes. Through the early 2010s, the school featured an Advancement Via Individual Determination (AVID) elective to support students' progress toward college, although the class has since been terminated due to low enrollment.

Today, Tierra Linda's campus is shared by Mariposa Upper Elementary School and the Charter Learning Center; additionally, through the late 2010s, a local preschool, Edison Montessori, was housed on the campus. Access to all campuses comes from a single entrance off Devonshire Boulevard in San Carlos, resulting in significant traffic congestion during drop-off and pick-up times. As of January 2023, two SamTrans routes serve Tierra Linda, including one school-day only route, Route 61, whose schedule is timed to coincide with Tierra Linda's bell schedule. This bus route is frequently used by local students, particularly those from San Carlos' western hills, neighborhoods which are often inaccessible by walking or biking.

History

Early Years 
The first wave of baby boomers, born after World War II, entered school in the 1950s. In San Carlos, local class sizes jumped to more than forty students; district-wide, enrollment increased from 340 students in 1940 to 2,249 students by 1949, and 3,388 in 1965. To accommodate this growth, the San Carlos School District opened several elementary schools to serve students in grades K–6. When the city's only middle school, Central Middle School, reached capacity, local School Board members studied potential locations for a second middle school. In particular, due to recent growth on the city's west side, locations near Carlmont High School in Belmont were considered.

By March 1951, the district purchased a 20-acre site belonging to the Rosenau Estate, at a cost of $68,750, the present-day site of Tierra Linda. Devonshire Boulevard, which lies east of Tierra Linda's campus, was the original western boundary of San Carlos, meaning Tierra Linda was originally located within Belmont's boundaries. The site was transferred to the City of San Carlos in October 1956, several years after the school's opening. The school was constructed in 1952 and 1953 at a cost of $441,042. It opened in the 1953–1954 school year for grades 7 and 8, although this range of students later increased to grades K–8. Students who attended Arundel School and Heather School for elementary school were typically slotted to attend Tierra Linda. From the 1960s to his retirement in 1980, Ralph Howitt served as the school's principal, following his tenure at local elementary school Brittan Acres.
In the 1950s, San Carlos developed additional neighborhoods west of Alameda de las Pulgas, including an annexation of 500 acres which provided homes for 6,000 residents. Enrollment at local schools increased through the end of the 1960s, but by the late 1970s, all San Carlos schools experienced declining enrollment. In 1982, with too few students to justify the opening of the school, the district closed Tierra Linda. Elementary schools served K–6 students, and all seventh and eighth grade students in San Carlos attended Central Middle School.

By the 1990s, enrollment was predicted to increase in San Carlos schools. Elementary schools were reorganized to house students in grades K–4, and Tierra Linda officially reopened on September 5, 2000 to grades 5–8. Prior to the reopening, several new buildings were constructed on the site, including locker rooms, a gym, a music room, a library, a computer room, and the science wing. The school's office was remodeled in 2005, and a band room and art room were also built. Most classrooms were modernized in 2007, and several portables in the "M" wing were also brought to campus in the same year.

In 2012, MSN highlighted Tierra Linda in a feature video, due to the school's construction of several low-cost, energy-efficient portables to its campus. Traditional portables are among the least energy-efficient buildings in California, and the Tierra Linda portables, constructed by Green Apple Classrooms, were noted for their forward-thinking design.

2015–2018 Renovation and Restructuring 
Throughout San Carlos, schools were predicted to experienced increased enrollment, necessitating the construction of additional classrooms. As most elementary schools were already nearing capacity, the San Carlos School District opted instead to bring fourth grade students, previously at elementary schools, to its two middle schools. Schools were restructured into three levels: grades K–3 elementary schools, grades 4–5 upper elementary schools, and grades 6–8 middle schools.

Tierra Linda, which had previously unofficially divided students into a Lower House (for grades 5–6) and an Upper House (for grades 7–8) was split into its current 6–8 school and a new Mariposa Upper Elementary School.. The Measure H Facility Bond Program, passed in November 2012 by San Carlos voters, was used to fund the renovation of Tierra Linda and Mariposa classrooms.

Between 2016 and 2017, the school office was remodeled. The former multi-purpose room, which had been in use since the 1950s, was also torn down and rebuilt, rebranded into a wide-open "Learning Commons" building to be used for individual workspace and group projects. A row of classrooms on the school's north side, officially named buildings "C" and "E," were officially changed to be used as fourth and fifth grade classrooms at Mariposa. One of these classrooms is also used as the school's orchestra room.

Construction was delayed significantly, due to missed delivery dates from various companies. Overall, the project cost about $5 million more than the district initially budgeted. A year after the expected completion date, Mariposa opened to fifth grade students in August 2018, and fourth and fifth grade students in August 2019. The two schools share facilities such as the library, Learning Commons, band and orchestra rooms, and play structures. Despite newly painted classrooms, exterior fencing, and TV monitors in each classroom, the construction remains incomplete as of the 2012 facilities plan, due to the fact that Mariposa lacks a separate Learning Commons or multi-purpose space.

Electives and Programs

Sports and Extracurricular Activities 
Tierra Linda maintains several after-school sports teams, including basketball, volleyball, tennis, cross country, flag football, and others. The school is part of the Art David Athletic League. Weekly, students also meet for a dedicated enrichment activity they sign up for, such as a team to design the annual Yearbook, named the "Quest" period. In addition to several student-run clubs, Tierra Linda hosts a weekly Math Club. The club is organized by a former parent and attracts about 50 students annually.

Students have the opportunity to participate in an annual musical, organized by the San Carlos Children's Theater, alongside other San Carlos middle school students. Every January, participating students from both Central and Tierra Linda compete in a swing dancing competition named the Swing Off, dancing to music provided by the two schools' jazz bands and under the evaluation of teachers. Historically, seventh grade students attend Westminster Woods, an environmental education program in Sonoma County.

Outside of school, Tierra Linda students are encouraged to develop a project for the San Carlos School District's Science Fair, typically under individual mentorship from local professionals. Sixth and eighth graders can also complete an independent enrichment project and present their efforts to community members, as part of the district's annual ROPES (Rite Of Passage ExperienceS program) experience.

Music 
Locally, Tierra Linda's performing arts groups participate in various community events, including the Hometown Days Festival each May. The school offers an orchestra, band, and audition-only jazz band elective, in addition to the Voicebox Choir that meets after school weekly. These groups compete annually at events hosted by the California Music Educators Association. In April 2019, during a field trip to Disneyland, the music groups performed at the World Strides On Stage Heritage Festival in Anaheim, California, where the four groups received first place Gold awards.

The music program is supported by the San Carlos Education Foundation, which asks families for donations each year. In addition, for the past decade, San Carlos music directors organize an annual community performance, the Faculty and Friends Concert, held at a local church. Although proceeds from ticket sales now support the Education Foundation generally, in early years, Tierra Linda students went door-to-door selling tickets, the proceeds of which went directly to Tierra Linda's programs.

Statistics

Demographics 
2019–2020, based on Tierra Linda's 2019 School Accountability Report Card:

 500 students: 244 male (48.8%), 256 female (51.2%)

Among the student body:

 5.8% of students are English language learners
 11.4% of students receive special education services
 0.4% of students are homeless
 8.0% of students are eligible for free and reduced-price lunch

References

External links 

 Official website

Educational institutions established in 1953
Educational institutions established in 2000
1953 establishments in California
Middle schools in California
Education in San Mateo County, California